Events from the year 1847 in China.

Incumbents 
 Daoguang Emperor (27th year)

Viceroys
 Viceroy of Zhili — Nergingge
 Viceroy of Min-Zhe — Yang Yizeng
 Viceroy of Huguang — Yutai
 Viceroy of Shaan-Gan — ?
 Viceroy of Liangguang — Qiying
 Viceroy of Yun-Gui — Lin Zexu, Lin Xingyuan
 Viceroy of Sichuan — Qishan
 Viceroy of Liangjiang:
 Bichang (21 January 1845 - 30 April 1847)
 Lu Jianying (8 March 1847 - 30 April 1847, Stand-in as Provincial Governor of Jiangsu)
 Li Xingyuan (30 April 1847 – 26 April 1849, Left office due to illness)

Events 
 March — Treaty of Canton, the first treaty made between Sweden-Norway and the Chinese Empire
  August 27 — Hong Xiuquan returned to the Thistle Mountains from Hua County, the God Worshipers numbered over 2,000.  At this time, most God Worshippers were peasants and miners.
 The Presbyterian Church of England founded and resolved to establish a mission in China. The Rev. William Chalmers Burns went first to Hong Kong and then to Amoy
 American Methodist Episcopal Society (North) entered the field of China

Births 
 Au Fung-Chi (1847–1914), the secretary of the Hong Kong Department of Chinese Affairs

References

 Martin, Robert Montgomery. China, Political, Commercial, and Social, 2 vols. 1847.